Ameleta is a monotypic moth genus in the subfamily Arctiinae. Its only species, Ameleta panochra, is found in Queensland, Australia. Both the genus and species were first described by Turner in 1940. The habitat consists of wet tropical areas.

References

Lithosiini
Moths described in 1940
Monotypic moth genera
Moths of Australia